Dánszentmiklós is a village in Pest County, Hungary.

References

Populated places in Pest County